Sandra Wiegers  (born April 26, 1974 in Hoogeveen) is a former Dutch female volleyball player who participated in the 1992 Summer Olympics. She and Team Netherlands finished 6th in women's volleyball. 🇳🇱

External links
 
 

1974 births
Living people
Dutch women's volleyball players
Volleyball players at the 1992 Summer Olympics
Olympic volleyball players of the Netherlands
People from Hoogeveen
Sportspeople from Drenthe